William Spoelhof (December 8, 1909 – December 3, 2008) was the President of Calvin College, and President Emeritus of the Grand Rapids, Michigan school.

Biography
Spoelhof was a native of Paterson, New Jersey, and graduated from Calvin College in 1931. He received a master's degree from the University of Michigan in 1937. After completing his doctoral studies, he returned to Calvin to teach history and political science in 1946.

In 1956, after becoming president of the college, Spoelhof was responsible for the initiation of the school's move to its current Knollcrest campus. The move was not completed until 1973. Toward the end of the 1960s Spoelhof also had to deal with the impact of nationwide student protest movements on the Calvin campus.

In 1935 Spoelhof married Angeline Nydam and they had three children. The asteroid 129099 Spoelhof is named in his honour.

Spoelhof died on December 3, 2008, just five days shy of his 99th birthday.

Military service
On June 17, 1943, Spoelhof applied for a commission or warrant officer's rank in the US Naval Reserve and was accepted, becoming a Lieutenant, Junior Grade. He joined the OSS and served as an intelligence analyst, specifically focusing upon the liberation of the Netherlands.  His mission of gathering intelligence in the Netherlands was terminated on October 10, 1945, and he was released from active duty on November 9, 1945.

On January 31, 1946, he was awarded the Bronze star for his actions during the liberation of the Netherlands. On February 23, 1946, he was invested as a Knight of the Order of Orange-Nassau by decree of Queen Wilhelmina.

References

Bibliography
Cassidy, William L., ed.  History of the Schools and Training Branch, Office of Strategic Services.  San Francisco:  Kingfisher Press, 1983.
Roosevelt, Kermit.  War Report of the OSS (Office of Strategic Services).  New York:  Walker, 1976.
0Katz, Barry M.  Foreign Intelligence: Research and Analysis in the Office of Strategic Services, 1942-45.  Cambridge and London:  Harvard Press, 1989.
OSS Assessment Staff.  Assessment of Men; Selection of Personnel for the Office of Strategic Services.  New York:  Rinehart and Company, 1948.
Dejong, Gerald F.  The Dutch in America, 1609-1974.  Boston:  Twayne Publishers, 1975.
Lucas, Henry S.  Netherlanders in America: Dutch Immigration to the United States and Canada, 1789-1950.  Grand Rapids:  William B. Eerdmans Publishing Co., 1989.

External links
William Spoelhof
William Spoelhof Society

1909 births
2008 deaths
American people of Dutch descent
Calvin University faculty
Calvin University alumni
University of Michigan alumni
People from Paterson, New Jersey
Presidents of Calvin University
American members of the Christian Reformed Church in North America
20th-century American academics